Keddie is a census-designated place in Plumas County, California, United States. The population was 66 at the 2010 census.

Geography

Keddie is the location of the Keddie Wye, a railroad junction that features bridges and tunnels.

History

A post office called Keddie was established in 1910, and remained in operation until 1966. The community's name honors Arthur W. Keddie, a railroad surveyor.

Keddie was also the site of the Keddie murders, a notorious unsolved mass murder.

Demographics

2010
The 2010 United States Census reported that the CDP had a population of 66. The racial makeup of the CDP was 93.9% White, 3.0% African American, and 3.0% from two or more races. 0.0% of the population was Hispanic or Latino of any race.

The Census reported that 100% of the population lived in households.

There were 32 households, out of which 5 (15.6%) had children under the age of 18 living in them, 13 (40.6%) were opposite-sex married couples living together, 4 (12.5%) had a female householder with no spouse present, 2 (6.3%) had a male householder with no spouse present.  There were 4 (12.5%) unmarried opposite-sex partnerships, and 1 (3.1%) same-sex married couples or partnerships. 8 households (25.0%) were made up of individuals, and 5 (15.6%) had someone living alone who was 65 years of age or older. The average household size was 2.06.  There were 19 families (59.4% of all households); the average family size was 2.47.

The population was spread out, with 7 people (10.6%) under the age of 18, 4 people (6.1%) aged 18 to 24, 7 people (10.6%) aged 25 to 44, 29 people (43.9%) aged 45 to 64, and 19 people (28.8%) who were 65 years of age or older.  The median age was 52.5 years. For every 100 females, there were 100.0 males.  For every 100 females age 18 and over, there were 90.3 males.

There were 65 housing units of which 78.1% were owner-occupied and 21.9% were occupied by renters. The homeowner vacancy rate was 0%; the rental vacancy rate was 22.2%. 77.3% of the population lived in owner-occupied housing units and 22.7% lived in rental housing units.

2000
As of the census of 2000, there were 96 people, 37 households, and 23 families residing in the CDP. The racial makeup of the CDP was 86.46% White, 2.08% Black or African American, 1.04% Native American, 3.12% Asian, 4.17% from other races, and 3.12% from two or more races. 7.29% of the population were Hispanic or Latino of any race.

There were 37 households, out of which 32.4% had children under the age of 18 living with them, 54.1% were married couples living together, 5.4% had a female householder with no husband present, and 37.8% were non-families. 24.3% of all households were made up of individuals, and 2.7% had someone living alone who was 65 years of age or older. The average household size was 2.59 and the average family size was 3.17.

In the CDP, the population was spread out, with 24.0 under the age of 18, 5.2% from 18 to 24, 31.3% from 25 to 44, 33.3% from 45 to 64, and 6.3% who were 65 years of age or older. The median age was 42 years. For every 100 females, there were 100.0 males. For every 100 females age 18 and over, there were 92.1 males.

The median income for a household in the CDP was $64,583, and the median income for a family was $76,721. Males had a median income of $0 versus $50,227 for females. The per capita income for the CDP was $22,685. There were no families and 8.9% of the population living below the poverty line, including no under eighteens and none of those over 64.

Politics

See also
 Keddie murders

References

Census-designated places in Plumas County, California
Census-designated places in California